The South American Youth Championship 1997 was held in Coquimbo, Iquique and La Serena, Chile. It also served as qualification for the 1997 FIFA World Youth Championship.

Teams
The following teams entered the tournament:

 
 
 
  (host)

Venues 
 Estadio Nacional Julio Martínez, Santiago
 Estadio Municipal Presidente Salvador Allende, Calama 
 Estadio La Portada, La Serena 
 Estadio Francisco Sánchez Rumoroso, Coquimbo
 Estadio Tierra de Campeones, Iquique

First round

Group 1

Group 2

Final round

Qualification to World Youth Championship
The four best performing teams qualified for the 1997 FIFA World Youth Championship.

Broadcasting rights

Americas 
  Chile: UCV Televisión, Universidad Católica de Chile Televisión, Megavisión and La Red (some matches); VTR, Metrópolis Intercom, Cable Express, TeleRed, Metrópolis TV Cable, TV Cable Intercom & Multicanal (all matches) 
  Brazil: Rede Bandeirantes

External links
Results by RSSSF

South American Youth Championship
International association football competitions hosted by Chile
1997 in South American football
1997 in youth association football
1997 in Chilean football
Youth sport in Chile